From All Sides is a collaboration between pianist Vince Guaraldi and guitarist Bola Sete released in February 1965 by Fantasy Records. It was Guaraldi's seventh studio album and the second of three collaborations with Sete.

Background
Several songs were new variations of previously recorded material. "Ginza Samba", originally titled "Ginza", was first recorded for Modern Music from San Francisco (1956), Guaraldi's debut release as a group leader.

The album also includes several songs that were reimagined for future inclusion in several Peanuts soundtracks. "The Little Drummer Boy", titled "Menino Pequeno Da Bateria", would later be featured in A Charlie Brown Christmas as "My Little Drum." In addition, "Choro" is a variation of Wolfgang Amadeus Mozart's Symphony No. 40 in G minor, K. 550, I. Molto allegro. It was revamped in 1968 for use in He's Your Dog, Charlie Brown, retitled "Schroeder's Wolfgang".

Release and reception 

Richard S. Ginell of AllMusic gave the album three out of five stars, noting that "although Guaraldi was in somewhat fresher form in his other albums with Sete, this one won't disappoint his fans."

In 1998, the album was remastered by Phil De Lancie and issued on CD for the first time.

Track listing
All tracks written by Vince Guaraldi, except where noted.

Personnel 
Credits adapted from 1965 vinyl release.
Bola Sete – guitar
Vince Guaraldi Trio
Vince Guaraldi – piano
Fred Marshall – double bass 
Monty Budwig – double bass 
Jerry Granelli – drums 
Nick Martinez – drums 
Additional
Ralph J. Gleason – liner notes

Release history

References

External links 
 

1965 albums
Collaborative albums
Fantasy Records albums
Vince Guaraldi albums
Bola Sete albums
Bossa nova albums
Latin jazz albums
Latin music albums by American artists